The Aloha 32 is a Canadian sailboat that was designed by Mark Ellis as a cruiser and first built in 1979.

Production
The design was built by Aloha Yachts, a brand of Ouyang Boat Works, in Canada from 1979 to 1988, but it is now out of production.

Design
The Aloha 32 is a recreational keelboat, built predominantly of fibreglass, with teak wooden trim. It has a masthead sloop rig, a spooned raked stem, a raised transom, an internally mounted spade-type rudder controlled by a wheel and a fixed fin keel. It displaces  and carries  of lead ballast. The bow has an anchor chain locker and roller.

The design has two interior layouts, one that dispenses with the bow "V"-berth. The galley is located to port, at the bottom of the companionway steps and features foot-pumped water, a single sink and a two-burner kerosene stove. The head is to starboard, opposite the gallery. The cabin sole is teak and holly and the provided interior lockers have cane doors. There are teak battens mounted on the cabin ceiling.

Ventilation is provided by two large translucent hatches and two small ones, plus six opening, screened posts.

From the factory the boat came with an "Ulmer" mainsail and two genoas, a number 1 and number 3. Reefing, outhaul and halyards are all by internal lines.

The design has a PHRF racing average handicap of 171.

Operational history
A review by Richard Sherwood described the design, "the Aloha is light and should accelerate well. It is primarily a cruiser.

In a review Michael McGoldrick wrote, "Mark Ellis appears to have successfully squeezed in everything from the Niagara 35 into this 32 footer - everything is just a little tighter. Aside from 3 feet in the overall length, the main difference between the two boats is that one was manufactured by Hinterhoeller, and the other by Aloha (two builders who had good reputations)."

See also
List of sailing boat types

Similar sailboats
Bayfield 30/32
Beneteau 323
C&C 32
Columbia 32
Douglas 32
Hunter 32 Vision
Hunter 326
Mirage 32
Nonsuch 324
Ontario 32
Ranger 32
Watkins 32

References

Keelboats
1970s sailboat type designs
Sailing yachts
Sailboat type designs by Mark Ellis
Sailboat types built by Ouyang Boat Works